Richard Maynard is an American television, film and stage actor.

Filmography
John Sheets in Frank & Jesse (1994)
Melby in Agent on Ice (1986)

Television
Angus Binns in St. Elsewhere (1984, 2 episodes)
"The Children's Hour"
"Homecoming"

Stage
Michael in Someone Who'll Watch Over Me, a hostage drama by Frank McGuinness

External links

Year of birth missing (living people)
Living people
American male film actors
American male television actors
American male stage actors